Suresh Kashyap is a leader of the Bahujan Samaj Party in Uttar Pradesh.
On 10 June 2016, he was elected to the Uttar Pradesh Legislative Council.

References

Members of the Uttar Pradesh Legislative Council
Living people
Year of birth missing (living people)
Place of birth missing (living people)
Bahujan Samaj Party politicians from Uttar Pradesh